Denticetopsis royeroi is a species of whale catfish endemic to Venezuela where it is only known from the holotype collected in a tributary to the upper Rio Negro.  This species grows to a length of 1.8 cm (0.7 inches).

References 
 

Cetopsidae
Catfish of South America
Endemic fauna of Venezuela
Fish of Venezuela
Fish described in 1996